The WindSled or Inuit WindSled is a project that has as central axis a wind vehicle, unique in the world, to travel and transport equipment through polar lands, and which has been designed by the Spanish polar explorer, Ramón Hernando de Larramendi.

The vehicle is based on Inuit tradition, which Larramendi has combined with large kites so that it may progress through the interior of the Arctic and Antarctic plateau, driven by aeolian energy. The Inuit WindSled has been improving for the last 18 years, during which it has served as a scientific platform for projects of different Spanish and international scientific institutions. Its purpose is to develop scientific and geographic exploration projects with zero emissions in polar regions.

Layout 
This is the so-called 'Larramendi platform', the name of its designer. These rails and crossbars are joined by about 2,000 knots with high resistance ropes, which gives flexibility to adapt to irregularities in the terrain. In the lower part, it has Teflon platforms to facilitate sliding.

The first of the modules has a piloting tent where the kite controls are located, but it also has a work space. Next, two modules are attached for the load, and that's where all the equipment goes. The last module has another larger tent for crew rest. With this configuration, it can be divided into two vehicles when terrain and conditions require it.

It is equipped with photovoltaic panels for the electrical supply of the scientific and communications equipment it carries on board and all the composing parts can be repaired without the need of external assistance.

History and evolution 
After traveling more than  through the Arctic, during the Circumpolar  Expedition, Ramón H. de Larramendi learned the construction and handling of Inuit sleds and observed the force of the winds in polar territories. It was the germination of the WindSled project.

At the beginning of year 2000, he designed the first models of the vehicle and after performing several tests with fiberglass and wood, he found that the latter, following the Inuit tradition, was much more effective than more modern materials. Despite the difficulties, it was a success.

The first crossings in Greenland, in the years 2000, 2001, 2002 and 2003, strengthened the possibilities of the mobile platform on the polar terrain. It would obtain the '2001 Trip of the Year' Award from the Spanish Geographical Society.

Right after the 2005-2006 Transantarctic Expedition, the expedition decided to use the vehicle for polar scientific exploration, once possibilities of navigating with a heavy load were proven. In addition to serving for geographic exploration, scientific data could be collected on the crossings. With that objective, in 2012, after the Acciona Antarctica Expedition, a prototype of two modules was presented to the Spanish polar scientific community at the Autonomous University of Madrid. It was also presented to the scientific community in Great Britain.

During the 2014 and 2016 expeditions in Greenland, the WindSled designer developed new technical possibilities in two Arctic expeditions, increasing its dimensions. They covered . It was confirmed that, even in extreme conditions, the WindSled was a sustainable and efficient means of transport. The last expedition, 2017 Greenland Ice River, took place in the spring of that year, with five crew on board. It took 28 days to cover  and different international scientific projects related to climate change were developed in collaboration with the East Greenland Ice-Core Project (EastGRIP) scientific base at NEGIS, the Dark Snow Project and other relevant scientific institutions.

Scientific research 
In parallel to these external improvements, the interest of polar scientists has increased. Among the most relevant, the American glaciologist Jason Box, Geological Survey of Denmark and Greenland (GEUS), and the Spaniards, Antonio Quesada, Autonomous University of Madrid and Spanish Polar Program manager, Ignacio López Moreno, Pyrenean Institute of Ecology (CSIC) and Juan José Blanco, University of Alcalá.

In 2016, the first scientific results of samples taken on the WindSled Acciona Antarctica expedition were published. An investigation, published in November in the scientific journal Atmospheric Environment, revealed the existence of persistent organic pollutants (POPs), from pesticides, in the interior of Antarctica. The main researchers were Jordi Dachs and Ana Cabrerizo, Institute of Environmental Diagnosis and Water Studies (IDAEA-CSIC).

In 2017, polar researcher Ross Edwards, with the international Dark Snow Project, participated as part of the expedition crew in Greenland, collecting data for the project.

Expeditions 
 Greenland Traverse 2000: , 10 days.
 Greenland Traverse North-South 2001: , 32 days.
 Greenland Traverse South-North 2002: , 33 days.
 Greenland Traverse East-West 2003: , 18 days.
 WindSled Trasantarctic Expedition 2005-2006: , 62 days.
 Acciona WindPowered Antarctica 2011-2012: , 38 days.
 Greenland Circumnavigation 2014: , 49 days.
 Greenland Ice Summit Expedition 2016: , 38 days.
 Ice River Greenland 2017: , 28 days.

References

External links 
 Inuit WindSled
 Acciona WindPowered Antarctica
 Ramon Larramendi website
 National Geographic
 Greenland.com
 ExplorersWeb
 Brief YouTube video

Polar exploration
Sledding
Specialized polar vehicles